Nsangi is a town in the Central Region of Uganda. It is one of the urban centers in Wakiso District.

Location
Nsangi is located in Nsangi Parish, Nsangi sub-county, Wakiso District, in Uganda's Central Region. The coordinates of Nsangi town are: 0°17'03.0"N 32°27'18.0"E (Latitude:0.284167; Longitude:32.455000).

Population
In 2009, the population of Nsangi was estimated at 3,522, by the Uganda Bureau of Statistics.

Points of interest
The following points of interest are found within the own limits or near the town boundaries: (a) The administrative headquarters of Nsangi sub-county, an administrative unit of Wakiso District Administration (b) The offices of Nsangi Town Council (c) Nsangi Central Market (d) Chrysanthemums Uganda Limited - A horticultural farm belonging to the Madhvani Group (e) The Kampala-Masaka Road - The highway passes through town in a northeast to southwest direction (f) Nsangi Secondary School, a public, mixed, day high school.

Economic activity
In the environs of town and in the surrounding Nsangi sub-county and in neighboring Ssisa sub-county, many households have engaged in the growing of Khat, also known as Miraa, but is locally referred to as Mairungi or Mayirungi. The product is sold in Kampala to members of the Somali community in Kisenyi, a section of the city. Truck drivers from neighboring Kenya also buy it for personal use and for re-sale in Kenya, where its use is more prevalent. Local growers have built houses, schools and bought personal property from the sale of this product. (Luganda)

See also

References

External links
Map of Nsangi Sub-county, Busiro County, Wakiso District, Central Region, Uganda

Wakiso District
Populated places in Central Region, Uganda